was a district located in central Iyo Province (Ehime Prefecture). Due to the 1878 Land Reforms, the district merged with Onsen District and the district dissolved.

See also
List of dissolved districts of Japan
Wake District

Wake District